The Professional Record Standards Body was established in the United Kingdom in April 2013 by the Academy of Medical Royal Colleges. Its members are organisations representing those who receive and provide health and social care across the UK, as well as those providing the Information Technology systems. Professor Maureen Baker is the Chair.

In November 2017 it produced standards setting out what information from screening tests, immunisations and other developmental milestones can be accessed by health and social professionals, parents and guardians.

It awarded its first  quality mark for conformance to core information standards to  Orion Health in September 2022.

In October 2022 it published  a report extending its shared care record standards to pharmacy, optometry, dentistry, ambulance and community services.

References

Medical and health organisations based in the United Kingdom
Health informatics and eHealth associations